The Japanese School of Kuala Lumpur (JSKL; Japanese: クアラルンプール日本人学校, Kuararunpūru Nihonjin Gakkō) is a Japanese international school in Saujana Golf and Country Club in Subang, Selangor, Malaysia. The syllabus at this school is based on the Japanese Education Curriculum.

See also 
 List of schools in Selangor

References

Sources

Further reading

Online access:
 Taura, Kazuko (田浦 加津子 Taura Kazuko). "Research on the Internationality of Students of the Japanese School of Kuala Lumpur" (Archive; クアラルンプール日本人学校児童・生徒の国際性に関する調査研究). Intercultural Communication Studies (異文化コミュニケ-ション研究) (3), 51–68, 2000–02. 愛知淑徳大学大学院コミュニケーション研究科異文化コミュニケーション専攻・言語文学研究所. English abstract available. See profile at CiNii, See profile at Aichi Shukutoku Knowledge Archive (ASKA-R; 愛知淑徳大学リポジトリ).
 Ozawa, Michimasa (小澤 至賢 Ozawa Michimasa; 国立特殊教育総合研究所教育相談部). "クアラルンプール日本人学校,シンガポール日本人学校チャンギ校及び中学部,バンコク日本人学校における特別支援教育の実情と教育相談支援" (Archive). 世界の特殊教育 21, 51–55, 2007–03. National Institute of Special Needs Education (独立行政法人国立特別支援教育総合研究所). See profile at CiNii.

No online access:
 Kamiya, Tsuyoshi (紙屋 剛 Kamiya Tsuyoshi; 前クアラルンプール日本人学校教諭・神奈川県川崎市立京町小学校教諭). "クアラルンプール日本人学校における国際理解教育 : 環境教育及び現地素材を開発して." 在外教育施設における指導実践記録 22, 43–46, 1999. Tokyo Gakugei University. See profile at CiNii.
 田邉 保博 (前クアラルンプール日本人学校中学部教諭・大阪府高石市立清高小学校教諭). "マレイシア・クアラルンプール日本人学校の教育事情." 在外教育施設における指導実践記録 26, 109–111, 2003. Tokyo Gakugei University. See profile at CiNii.
 小川 陽司 (前クアラルンプール日本人学校:愛知県豊橋市立新川小学校). "クアラルンプール日本人学校の国際交流(国際理解教育・現地理解教育) " 在外教育施設における指導実践記録 33, 97–98, 2010-12-24. Tokyo Gakugei University. See profile at CiNii.

External links
 JSKL website 

Kuala Lumpur
Japan–Malaysia relations
International schools in Selangor
Secondary schools in Selangor
Primary schools in Malaysia